Longwangmiao is a town of Donggang City in southeastern Liaoning province, China, located  northwest of downtown Donggang and  inland of Korea Bay. , it has one residential community and 7 villages under its administration.

See also 
 List of township-level divisions of Liaoning

References 

Towns in Liaoning